Suomenkieliset Tieto-Sanomat was a Finnish language newspaper . It was published in Turku twice a month in 1775 and 1776. The magazine's editor was Antti Lizelius.

References

Publications established in 1775
Finnish-language newspapers